Piney Woods is an unincorporated community in Rankin County, Mississippi, United States. It is the site of the Piney Woods Country Life School, a historically African-American boarding school established in 1909.

The community is part of the Jackson Metropolitan Statistical Area.

References

External links

Piney Woods Country Life School - Official site.

Unincorporated communities in Mississippi
Unincorporated communities in Rankin County, Mississippi
Jackson metropolitan area, Mississippi